Youhanon Demetrios is the metropolitan of Delhi Diocese of the Malankara Orthodox Syrian Church.

References

Malankara Orthodox Syrian Church bishops
1952 births
Living people